VfB Gaggenau is a German association football club from the city of Gaggenau, Baden-Württemberg established 27 July 1911. Following World War II, football and sports clubs across the country were disbanded by occupying Allied authorities as part of the broader process of denazification. The team was reestablished in 1946 as Sportverein Gaggenau, which included the former memberships of VfB, Turnerbund Gaggenau, and Ski-Club Gaggenau. It was renamed VfB Gaggenau on 5 August 1950.



History
VfB played local level football prior to the war with the club taking part in the regional Südpokal (South German Cup) in 1922. Following the conflict it became part of the Amateurliga Südbaden (III) in 1955 and, except for a second-place finish in 1960 and a third-place finish in 1963, earned generally lower table results. VfB was relegated in 1966 and did not return to Amateurliga play until 1977. They slipped to the Verbandsliga Südbaden (IV) through league restructuring the following season, and won their way to the Amateuroberliga Baden-Württemberg (IV) by winning the division title there in 1979. Their turn in the Amateuroberliga lasted just a single season and they did not return to fourth-tier play until 1986. In the 1994–95 season, the Amateuroberliga became the Oberliga Baden-Württemberg (IV). VfB narrowly missed demotion that year when GSV Maichingen voluntarily went down instead, but could not escape being sent down after another poor finish in the following campaign.

VfB has made several appearances (1976, 1980, 1981, 1990, 1994, 1996) in preliminary round play for the DFB Pokal (German Cup), going out after first round losses in each instance.

The club was bankrupted at the turn of the millennium, dropping out of the Verbandsliga in 2000–01, after having played 20 of 30 rounds, and was reestablished on 17 April 2001, restarting play in the tier nine Kreisliga B. After capturing the Bezirksliga Baden-Baden title in 2009, VfB played in the Landesliga Südbaden 1 (VII) until 2014, when the club was relegated back to the Bezirksliga. At the end of the 2015–16 season the club suffered another relegation, now to the Kreisliga.

Honours
The club's honours:

League
 Verbandsliga Südbaden
 Champions: 1979, 1986
 Bezirksliga Baden-Baden
 Champions: 2009
 Kreisliga A Baden-Baden Nord
 Champions: 2007
 Kreisliga B Baden-Baden 4
 Champions: 2006

Cup
 South Baden Cup
 Winners: 1980, 1989, 1993, 1995

Recent seasons
The recent season-by-season performance of the club:

 With the introduction of the Regionalligas in 1994 and the 3. Liga in 2008 as the new third tier, below the 2. Bundesliga, all leagues below dropped one tier.

References

External links
Official team site
Das deutsche Fußball-Archiv historical German domestic league tables (in German)
VfB Gaggenau (−2001) at Weltfussball.de
VfB Gaggenau (2001–) at Weltfussball.de

Football clubs in Germany
Football clubs in Baden-Württemberg
Association football clubs established in 1911
1911 establishments in Germany